Muqaddar Ka Faisla is a 1987 Hindi action film directed by Prakash Mehra and produced by Yash Johar. It stars Raaj Kumar, Raakhee, Raj Babbar, Meenakshi Sheshadri, Tina Munim in pivotal roles. Bappi Lahiri has composed the music for the film.

Cast
 Raaj Kumar as Pandit Krishnakant
 Raakhee as Rukmini
 Raj Babbar as Raj
 Meenakshi Seshadri as Meena
 Akbar Khan as Dr. Harish Kumar
 Tina Munim as Nisha
 Kaajal Kiran as Saroj
 Bindu as Mona
 Ranjeet as Chhadha
 Pran as Dhanraj
 Om Prakash as Dayaram
 Vijayendra Ghatge as Inspector Shekhar
 Dinesh Hingoo as Swarnmukhi
 Satyendra Kapoor as Chhaganlal

Plot
An honest Hindu pandit (priest) is framed for embezzlement and rape, and not only dismissed from employment, but also arrested and imprisoned, leaving behind his family in destitution. On his return from prison, he is unable to locate his family, and plans to avenge his humiliation. But the challenge is that how can a former pandit, ex-convict, penniless, homeless, and without any resources, avenge himself against the cunning and manipulative people who framed him?

Music
Lyrics: Anjaan

External links

1980s Hindi-language films
1987 films
Films directed by Prakash Mehra
Films scored by Bappi Lahiri